Posthumous publication refers to material that is published after the author's death. This can be because the author died before the work was completed or while trying to find a publisher. For example, Stieg Larsson died suddenly having submitted the first two of the Millennium novel series to a publisher. Other authors desire publication not to happen until after their death. Mark Twain did not want his autobiography to be published until 100 years after his death.

Posthumous publication can be controversial if it is believed that the author would not have wished the material to be published. For example, critics of a collection poems by Philip Larkin argued that many of the poems were unfinished or from early in his career, and that he would never have wished them to be made public.

See also
List of works published posthumously

References

Publishing